Panakkad Sayyid Sadiq Ali Shihab Thangal (born 25 May 1964) is a sayyid (thangal) community leader and politician from Kerala, southern India. He currently serves as the Kerala State President, Indian Union Muslim League.

Sadiq Ali Thangal is a member of the Pukkoya family of Panakkad (south Malabar). He is the son of P. M. S. A. Pukkoya Thangal and the younger brother of Mohammedali Thangal, Umerali Thangal and Hyderali Thangal. He is associated with Samastha Kerala Sunni Students Federation (S. K. S. S. F.) and Sunni Yuvajana Sangam (S. Y. S.), the student and youth wings of the E. K. faction of Samastha Kerala Jam'iyyat al-'Ulama', the principal Sunni-Shafi'i scholarly body in Kerala, and the Youth League, the youth wing of Indian Union Muslim League.  He also served as the Malappuram District President, Indian Union Muslim League for over a decade. He later led the party de facto for a short span in the absence of his ailing brother Hyderali Thangal. 

Sadiq Ali Thangal was chosen as the successor to Hyderali Thangal as the Kerala State President, Indian Union Muslim League in 2022. Sadiq Ali Thangal also serves as the Chairman, National Political Advisory Committee, Indian Union Muslim League. He is also Vice-President,  Mounathul Islam Sabha, Ponnani, President, Noorul Huda Islamic College and Chairman, Islamic Centre, Kozhikode. He is also the member of the executive committee of the Samastha Matha Vidyabhyasa Board.

Controversies 

 Differences with current leadership of E. K. faction of Samastha Kerala Jam'iyyat al-'Ulama', the principal Sunni-Shafi'i scholarly body in Kerala.

References

1964 births
Living people
Indian Union Muslim League politicians
Indian Sunni Muslims
People from Malappuram
Malayali politicians
Mappilas
Islam in Kerala
Kerala Sunni-Shafi'i scholars